Kumekucha is a 1987 Tanzanian documentary produced and directed by Flora M'mbugu-Schelling.

Plot 
Women taken charge of their destiny by empowering themselves through education enabling them to make a difference in the society.

References 

Tanzanian documentary films
1987 documentary films
1987 films